Mahal is a 1970 Indian mystery thriller film that stars Dev Anand, Asha Parekh, and Farida Jalal. The music was composed by Kalyanji Anandji. It was supposed to be released in 1969 but it was delayed and released in 1970. At the box office it was not successful.

Plot
Dev Anand (Rajesh) is a simple and poor driver-cum-assistant to a rich boss (Abhi Bhattacharya) in Kolkata. He is hard pressed for money for his sister's wedding, when out of the blue a stranger offers him money in return for playing an impostor of a brother-in-law for a dying old man in Darjeeling who owns a palace and of course has millions worth of property.

What seems like a simple task for Dev Anand who is in love with another rich girl (Asha Parekh) turns out to be a vicious trap, where he is caught red handed in front of a dead man, who is actually the owner of the palace, but not the one Dev had been meeting there till now. Farida Jalal as the seductive nurse complicates matters.

Nothing is as it seems and it turns out to be a good whodunit mystery with Dev Anand on the run from law to prove his innocence. The identity of the real villain remains a mystery and the climax comes as a surprise.

Cast
 Dev Anand as Rajesh Ratanlal Dixit / Ravinath Sharma 
 Asha Parekh as Roopa 
 Farida Jalal as Nurse 
 Abhi Bhattacharya as Shyam 
 David Abraham Cheulkar as Roopa's Dad (as David) 
 Ratnamala as Roopa's mom
 Sunder as Pyare 
 D. K. Sapru as Raja Dinanath / Badriprasad (as Sapru)
 Pratima Devi as Rajesh's mother
 Kamal Mehra as Jaikishan, guide in Darjeeling
 Murad (actor) as Police commissioner Ratan Singh
Rajan Haksar as Motilal
Manju Asrani as Motilal's girlfriend
 Azra as Chanda, (Munni) Dev Anand's sister
 R.P. Kapoor as Roopa's mamaji (uncle)
 Sudhir (Hindi actor) as Ramu / Inspector Rameshchandra Tripathi
 Ram singh as Raja Dinanath's chauffeur

Soundtrack

External links 
 

1969 films
1960s Hindi-language films
Films scored by Kalyanji Anandji